Katrina is a 1943 Swedish drama film directed by Gustaf Edgren and starring Märta Ekström, Frank Sundström and Hampe Faustman. It was shot at the Råsunda Studios in Stockholm. The film's sets were designed by the art director Arne Åkermark. It is an adaptation of the 1936 novel Katrina by Sally Salminen.

Cast
 Märta Ekström as 	Katrina
 Frank Sundström as Johan Johansson
 Hampe Faustman as 	Einar
 George Fant as 	Gustaf
 Birgit Tengroth as Saga Svensson
 Erik Berglund as 	Captain Nordquist
 Henrik Schildt as 	Captain August Ekvall
 Harry Ahlin as 	Andersson, sailor 
 Elsa Ebbesen as 	Klara, Saga's housekeeper 
 Greta Berthels as 	Beda
 Hugo Björne as 	Priest
 Linnéa Hillberg as Katrina's mother
 Anders Nyström as 	Herman
 Torsten Hillberg as Banker 
 Margit Andelius as Woman in church 
 Richard Lund as 	Pastor 
 Bertil Berglund as 	First mate 
 Bengt Brunskog as 	Man at the dance 
 Julie Bernby as Prostitute at Berns
 Siri Olson as Prostitute at Berns
 Kotti Chave as 	Einar's friend 
 Julia Cæsar as 	Woman in church 
 Carl Deurell as 	Katrina's father
 Olav Riégo as Ekvall's accountant
 Nina Scenna as 	Ekvall's maid

References

Bibliography 
 Goble, Alan. The Complete Index to Literary Sources in Film. Walter de Gruyter, 1999.

External links 
 

1943 films
Swedish drama films
1943 drama films
1940s Swedish-language films
Films directed by Gustaf Edgren
Films based on Finnish novels
1940s Swedish films